The Ashbel Smith Building, also known as Old Red, is a Romanesque Revival building located in Galveston, Texas. It was built in 1891 with red brick and sandstone. 
 Nicholas J. Clayton was the architect. It was the first University of Texas Medical Branch building.

In 1949, the building named for Ashbel Smith, a Republic of Texas diplomat and one of the founders of the University of Texas System. The building was registered as a Texas Historical Landmark in 1969 and renovated in 1985.

In 2008, Old Red was flooded with six feet of water by Hurricane Ike. It was also one of the few buildings to survive the Galveston Hurricane of 1900.

See also

National Register of Historic Places listings in Galveston County, Texas
Recorded Texas Historic Landmarks in Galveston County

References

External links

University of Texas Medical Branch
Buildings and structures in Galveston, Texas
National Register of Historic Places in Galveston County, Texas
Recorded Texas Historic Landmarks
School buildings completed in 1891
Romanesque Revival architecture in Texas
University and college buildings on the National Register of Historic Places in Texas